Imperial fortress was the designation given in the British Empire to four colonies that were located in strategic positions from each of which Royal Navy squadrons could control the surrounding regions and, between them, much of the planet.

History
The Imperial fortresses provided not only safe harbours and (with the advent of steam propulsion) coal stores within the area of operation, but also Royal Naval Dockyards where ships of the squadrons could be repaired or maintained without requiring their return to a dockyard in the British Isles.

The Imperial fortresses were also locations where military stores were stockpiled and numbers of soldiers sufficient not only for local defence, but also to provide expeditionary forces to work with the Royal Navy in amphibious campaigns and raids on coasts throughout the regions, could be garrisoned.

These Imperial fortresses originally included:

 Halifax, in Nova Scotia
 Bermuda
 Gibraltar
 Malta

They were the lynch pins in Britain's domination of the oceans and the Mediterranean and Caribbean seas, including its ability to deny safe passage to enemy naval and merchant vessels while protecting its own merchant trade, as well as to its projection of superior naval and military force anywhere on the planet.

Halifax and Bermuda controlled the transatlantic sea lanes between North America and Europe, and were placed to dominate the Atlantic seaboard of the United States (as demonstrated during the American War of 1812 when the squadron of the Royal Navy's North America Station maintained a blockade of the Atlantic coast of the United States and launched the Chesapeake Campaign from Bermuda, defeating American forces in the Battle of Bladensburg, capturing and burning Washington, DC, and raiding Alexandria, Virginia), as well as to control the western Atlantic Ocean from the Arctic to the West Indies (in the twentieth century, the Bermuda-controlled North America and West Indies Station of the Royal Navy would become the 'America and West Indies Station', its area growing to include the western South Atlantic and the Atlantic coast of South America, as well the Pacific coast from Tierra del Fuego to the Arctic). Gibraltar controlled passage between the Atlantic Ocean and the Mediterranean Sea, and Malta, aside from supporting operations in the Mediterranean and Black Sea, served as a base for naval and military forces that would be able to deploy relatively quickly to the Indian and Pacific Oceans once the Suez Canal was completed in 1869.

Halifax ceased to be an Imperial fortress in stages. With the 1867 confederation of the Dominion of Canada, military defence of Canada would be transferred to the militia of the dominion government, and the British Army withdrew most of its establishment from the continent, leaving small military garrisons to defend the Royal Naval Dockyard at Halifax, Nova Scotia and the Esquimalt Royal Navy Dockyard in British Columbia. These garrisons were withdrawn along with the Royal Navy establishments when the two Canadian dockyards were closed in 1905, then sold to the government of the dominion.

The lack of such an Imperial fortress in the region of Asia, the Indian Ocean and the Pacific Ocean was always to be a weakness throughout the nineteenth century (the British Government, ever unwilling to increase, or even maintain, its defence expenditure, relied on there being few nations outside of the Atlantic and its connected seas that possessed fleets capable of threatening British trade or territories, though the nascent United States of America were multiplying towards the Pacific coast of North America, and the Russian Empire and Japanese Empire both had ports on the Pacific and were keen to build large, modern fleets).

As Britain had no base comparable to an Imperial fortress in East Africa, Mauritius, India, Ceylon, Malaysia, Hong Kong, British Columbia or Australasia, after the 1869 completion of the Suez Canal Britain relied on Malta in the Mediterranean Sea to project power over this vast expanse. When the Panama Canal opened in 1914,  Britain was able to rely on amity and common interests between herself and the United States during and after the First World War, to also use Bermuda, from which cruisers could patrol the Pacific coasts of North, Central, and South America. Finally the rising power and increasing belligerence of the Japanese empire after the First World War would result in the construction of the Singapore Naval Base, which was completed in 1938, less than four years before hostilities with Japan commenced during the Second World War.

The need to protect these bases of operation, as well as to prevent, via their captures, their becoming bases of similar utility to an enemy, each was heavily defended, making fortress an apt designation. "Fortress" was often included when giving the names of these colonies, e.g. "Fortress Bermuda". Bermuda, protected by an almost impassable barrier reef and unconnected to any continent, required the least defences, but was heavily garrisoned and armed with coastal artillery batteries. Defence of Bermuda, and of the region, was greatly weakened by the economic austerity that followed the conclusion of the Napoleonic Wars and the American War of 1812, which resulted in drastic reductions to the regular forces and to Reserve Forces in the British Isles (Militia, Volunteer Force, and Fencibles), and in Bermuda (Militia and volunteer artillery), being allowed to lapse. Bermuda's garrison would slowly increase, with the threat of invasion by the United States during and after the American Civil War resulting in further strengthening of the defences. Bermuda's importance to Imperial defence was only increasing, however, and the parlous state of its own defence was commented upon by Sir Henry Hardinge in the House of Commons on the 22 March 1839:

Halifax was much more vulnerable to attack than Bermuda, which might come over land or water from the United States, Gibraltar was vulnerable to overland attack by Spain (which remains anxious to recover it) and by Napoleonic France, and both Gibraltar and Malta were much more vulnerable to the navies of the Mediterranean (notably those of Spain, France, Italy, and the Ottoman Empire), and were even more heavily defended.

Naval and military establishments of the Imperial fortresses

Bermuda
North America and West Indies Station Royal Navy establishment in Bermuda
Admiralty House, Bermuda
Rose Hill, St. George's Parish (1795 to 1810)
Mount Wyndham, Hamilton Parish (1810 to 1816)
St. John's Hill (renamed Clarence Hill in 1822), Pembroke Parish (1816 to 1956)
Royal Naval Dockyard Bermuda, and the history of the Royal Navy in Bermuda 1795–1995.
Convict Bay
Admiralty Island (now Hen Island)
Daniel's Head wireless station (formerly used by British Army. Later became Royal Canadian Navy NRS Bermuda. See both below)
Royal Naval Air Station Bermuda
Corps of Colonial Marines. 1814–1816.
Bermuda Sea Cadet Corps
Dominion of Canada and Commonwealth Realm of Canada establishment
HMCS Somers Isles 1944–1945
NRS Bermuda (renamed CFS Bermuda) (see Royal Navy Daniel's Head wireless station, above)
North America Command
Nova Scotia Command
Bermuda Garrison (or Bermuda Command after Confederation of Canada). 1701–1957.
St. George's Garrison (Eastern District Headquarters)
Ordnance Island
Royal Army Service Corps Wharf (St. George's)
St. George's Armoury
East Coast Forts (St. George's, Paget, Governor's, and St. David's Islands)
Fort St. Catherine's
Fort Victoria
Fort Albert
Western Redoubt
Fort George
Town Cut Battery (or Gates' Fort)
Alexandra Battery
Fort Cunningham
Fort Popple
Paget Fort
Smith's Fort
Peniston's Redoubt
St. David's Battery
Castle Islands Fortifications
Devonshire Redoubt
Landward Fort
Queen's Castle (King's Castle, The Castle, or Seaward Fort)
Southampton Fort (or Brangman's Fort)
Charles' Fort
Martello Tower
Burnt Point Fort
Ferry Island Fort
Prospect Camp (Command Headquarters and Central District Headquarters)
Warwick Camp
Agar's Island
Royal Army Service Corps Wharf (Hamilton)
Hamilton Armoury
Prospect Hill Position
Fort Prospect
Fort Langton
Fort Hamilton
South Shore Batteries (former fixed batteries adapted for field guns)
Fort Bruere
Bailey's Bay Battery (Tucker's Town Battery, and Tucker's Town Bay Fort)
Newton's Bay Fort (Hall's Bay Fort)
Albouy's Fort
Harris' Bay Fort
Sears' Fort
Devonshire Bay Fort
Hungry Bay Fort
Crow Lane Fort (also known as New Paget's Fort and East Elbow Bay Fort)
Middleton's Bay Fort (also known as Centre Bay Fort)
West Elbow Bay Fort
Warwick Camp Battery
Warwick Fort
Jobson's Cove Fort
Great Turtle Bay Battery
Jobson's Fort
Hunt's Fort (Lighthouse Fort)
Ingham's Fort
Church Bay Fort East
Church Bay Fort West
Boaz Island and Watford Island (Clarence Barracks; Western District Headquarters)
Somerset Armoury
Whale Bay Battery (West Whale Bay)
Whale Bay Fort (West Whale Bay)
West Side Fort
Wreck Hill Fort
Scaur Hill Fort
Daniel's Island Fort and Daniel's Head (later transferred to Royal Navy then Royal Canadian Navy)
Mangrove Bay Fort
King's Point Redoubt
Maria's Hill Fort
Bermuda Militia. 1612–1815.
Bermudian Militia, Volunteer and Territorial Army Units, 1895–1965
Bermuda Militia Artillery
Bermuda Volunteer Rifle Corps
Bermuda Volunteer Engineers
Bermuda Militia Infantry
Royal Bermuda Regiment
Bermuda Home Guard
Bermuda Cadet Corps
Royal Air Force, RAF Darrell's Island. 1939–1945.
Royal Air Force Transport Command station, Kindley Field

Halifax, Nova Scotia
Admiralty House, Halifax
Royal Naval Dockyard, Halifax
Halifax Defence Complex
Citadel Hill (Fort George)
Fort Charlotte
York Redoubt
Prince of Wales Tower
Connaught Battery
Practice Battery
Sandwich Point
Camperdown Signal Station
Fort Chebucto
Fort Charlotte on George's Island
Fort Clarence
Devil's Battery
Five forts on McNabs Island:
Fort Ives
Fort Hugonin
Sherbrooke Tower
Strawberry Hill
Fort McNab
5th Battalion, Royal Garrison Regiment

Gibraltar
British Forces Gibraltar
Royal Navy Dockyard, Gibraltar
Her Majesty's Naval Base Gibraltar
HMS Rooke
Fortifications of Gibraltar
Alexandra Battery
Civil Hospital Battery
Cumberland Flank Battery
Eliott's Battery
Europa Advance Batteries
Europa Battery
Europa Pass Battery
Gardiner's Battery
Genista Battery
Half Way Battery
Harding's Battery
Jones' Battery
King's Bastion
Lady Augusta's Battery
Lady Louisa's Battery
Lighthouse Battery
New Mole Battery
O'Hara's Battery
Orange Bastion
Parson's Lodge Battery
Prince Albert's Front
Prince of Wales Battery
Raglan's Battery
Rock Gun Battery
Signal Hill Battery
Bellman's Cave
Victoria Battery
Wellington Front
Windmill Hill Batteries
Woodford's Battery
Zoca Flank Battery
Devil's Tower Camp
Retrenched Barracks
RAF Gibraltar
Royal Gibraltar Regiment
2nd Battalion, Royal Garrison Regiment

Malta
Lascaris War Rooms
Admiralty House, Valletta
Royal Naval Dockyard, Malta
HMS Egmont or HMS St Angelo
HMS Phoenicia (Fort Manoel)
HMS Euroclydon
Royal Navy Hospital Mtarfa
Malta Command
Fortifications of Malta
Fortifications of Mdina
Cambridge Battery
Cittadella
Della Grazie Battery
Fort Benghisa
Fort Chambray
Fort Campbell
Fort Delimara
Fort Leonardo
Fort Mellieħa
Fort Ricasoli
Fort Rinella
Fort St. Angelo
Fort Saint Elmo
Fort Saint Michael
Fort Saint Rocco
Fort San Lucian
Fort San Salvatore
Fort Tas-Silġ
Fort Tigné
Fort Pembroke
Fort Verdala
Garden Battery
Għargħar Battery
Lascaris Battery
Pembroke Battery
Saint Mary's Tower (or Comino Tower)
Saint Paul's Battery
Sliema Point Battery
Spinola Battery
Tarġa Battery
Victoria Lines
Fort Binġemma
Fort Madalena
Fort Mosta
Wolseley Battery
Żonqor Battery
Pembroke Army Garrison
Malta Tanks (Royal Tank Regiment)
Royal Malta Artillery
Malta Fortress Squadron, Royal Engineers
Royal Signals in Malta
The King's Own Malta Regiment
1st, 3rd, and 4th Battalions, Royal Garrison Regiment
Royal Malta Fencible Regiment
Air Headquarters Malta
RAF Hal Far
RAF Luqa
RAF Ta Kali

See also
Military of Bermuda
Military of Gibraltar
Malta Command
Military history of Nova Scotia

References

British Overseas Territories
Former British colonies and protectorates in the Americas
Military units and formations of the British Empire
Royal Navy
History of the Royal Navy
Royal Navy dockyards
Royal Navy
History of Bermuda
Installations of the British Army
British Army deployments
Military units and formations of the British Army
History of the British Army
Military of Bermuda
Military locations of Bermuda
Military history of Malta